Howrah - Rampurhat Express is an Express train of the Indian Railways connecting Howrah Junction in West Bengal and Rampurhat Junction of West Bengal. It is currently being operated with train numbers 12347/12348 on a daily basis.

Service

The 12347/Howrah - Rampurhat (Shahid) SF Express has an average speed of 56 km/hr and covers 207 km in 3 hrs 40 mins. 12348/Rampurhat - Howrah (Shahid) Express has an average speed of 56 km/hr and covers 207 km in 3 hrs 40 mins.

Route and halts 

The important halts of the train are:

 
 
 
 
 
 Prantik railway station

Coach composite

The train has standard ICF rakes with max speed of 110 kmph. The train consists of 13 coaches :

 1 AC Chair Car (CC Coach)
 3 Second-seating chair car (2S Coach)
 7 General (GN Coach)
 2 Second-class Luggage/parcel van

Schedule
The schedule of this 12347/12348 Howrah–Rampurhat (Shahid) Express is given below:-

Traction

Both trains are hauled by a Howrah Loco Shed based WAP 4 / WAP 7 electric locomotive from Howrah to Rampurhat and vice versa.

Rake Sharing

The train shares its rake with 13053/13054 Howrah - Siuri Intercity Express

See also 

 Howrah Junction railway station
 Rampurhat Junction railway station
 Agniveena Express
 Howrah - Siuri Intercity Express
 Shantiniketan Express

Notes

External links 

 12347/Howrah - Rampurhat (Shahid) SF Express
 12348/Rampurhat - Howrah (Shahid) Express

References 

Rail transport in Howrah
Rail transport in West Bengal
Express trains in India